B2 is a major road in Namibia. The highway runs east-west between the major sea port of Walvis Bay and the nation's capital Windhoek. 

The B2's entire route forms the first section of both the Trans-Kalahari Corridor and the Walvis Bay-Ndola-Lubumbashi Development Road.

Route
B2 begins in Walvis Bay at a roundabout intersection with C14 and heads north along the coast of the South Atlantic Ocean for about 35 kilometers to Swakopmund. The route then heads northeast & east through inland Namibia for 291 kilometers where it ends at an intersection with B1 near Okahandja. The route passes through the Namib-Naukluft National Park and the Namib Desert. Major towns along the route are Arandis, Usakos, and Karibib.

Roads in Namibia